Truncatellina is a genus of very small air-breathing land snails, terrestrial pulmonate gastropod mollusks in the family Truncatellinidae.

Species 
Species in the genus Truncatellina include:

 Truncatellina adami  Bruggen, 1994
 Truncatellina algoviana  Colling & Karle-Fendt, 2016
 Truncatellina arboricola Tattersfield, 1995
 Truncatellina atomus (Shuttleworth, 1852)
 Truncatellina ayubiana Auffenberg & Pokryszko, 2009
 Truncatellina babusarica Auffenberg & Pokryszko, 2009
 Truncatellina beckmanni Quintana, 2010
  † Truncatellina belokrysi Prysjazhnjuk, 1978
 Truncatellina bhutanensis Gittenberger, Leda & Sherub, 2013
 † Truncatellina biscoitoi Hutterer & Groh, 1993 
 Truncatellina callicratis (Scacchi, 1833)
 Truncatellina cameroni Triantis & Pokryszko, 2004
 Truncatellina claustralis (Gredler, 1856)
 Truncatellina costulata (Nilsson, 1823)
 † Truncatellina cryptodonta (A. Braun, 1851) 
 Truncatellina cylindrica (J. B. Férussac, 1807)
 † Truncatellina dentata Steklov, 1966 
 Truncatellina dysorata (Melvill & Ponsonby, 1893)
 Truncatellina flavogilva Germain, 1934
 Truncatellina haasi Venmans, 1957
 Truncatellina himalayana (Benson, 1863)
 Truncatellina insulivaga (Pilsbry & Hirase, 1904)
 Truncatellina iota (Melvill & Ponsonby, 1894)
 Truncatellina laeviuscula  (Küster, 1850)  (uncertain)
 Truncatellina lardea (Jickeli, 1874)
 Truncatellina lentilii (Miller, 1900)
 Truncatellina linearis (R. T. Lowe, 1852)
 Truncatellina lussinensis (R. T. Lowe, 1852)
 Truncatellina maresquelli Fischer-Piette, C. P. Blanc, F. Blanc & Salvat, 1994
 † Truncatellina micra (Ping, 1929) 
 Truncatellina monodon  (Held, 1837)
 Truncatellina naivashaensis (Preston, 1911)
 Truncatellina ninagongonis (Pilsbry, 1935)
 Truncatellina obesa Adam, 1954
 Truncatellina opisthodon  (Reinhardt, 1879)
 Truncatellina pantherae Harzhauser & Neubauer in Harzhauser et al., 2014
 Truncatellina perplexa (Burnup in Melvill & Ponsonby, 1908)
 † Truncatellina podolica (Łomnicki, 1886) 
 † Truncatellina portosantana Hutterer & Groh, 1993 
 Truncatellina prainhana Hutterer & Groh, 1993
 Truncatellina pretoriensis (Melvill & Ponsonby, 1893)
 Truncatellina purpuraria Hutterer & Groh, 1993
 Truncatellina pygmaeorum (Pilsbry & Cockerell, 1933)
 Truncatellina quantula (Melvill & Ponsonby, 1893)
 Truncatellina ruwenzoriensis Adam, 1957
 Truncatellina silvicola de Winter, 1990
 Truncatellina splendidula (Sandberger, 1875)
 Truncatellina suprapontica Wenz & Edlauer, 1942
 Truncatellina sykesii (Melvill & Ponsonby, 1893)
 † Truncatellina taurica Prysjazhnjuk, 1978 
 Truncatellina thomensis D. T. Holyoak & G. A. Holyoak, 2020
 Truncatellina uniarmata (Küster, 1856) (uncertain)
 Truncatellina upembae Adam, 1954
 Truncatellina velkovrhi  Štamol, 1995

Synonyms
 Truncatellina arcyensis W. Klemm, 1943: synonym of Truncatellina cylindrica (A. Férussac, 1807) (junior synonym)
 † Truncatellina cryptodus (F. Sandberger, 1858): synonym of † Truncatellina cryptodonta (A. Braun, 1851) 
 † Truncatellina dilatata Yu, 2020: synonym of † Euthema dilatata (Yu, 2020) 
 † Truncatellina dilatatus Yu, 2020: synonym of † Euthema dilatata (Yu, 2020) 
 Truncatellina mutandaensis (Preston, 1913): synonym of Truncatellina naivashaensis (Preston, 1911) (junior synonym)
 Truncatellina rivierana (Benson, 1854): synonym of Truncatellina callicratis (Scacchi, 1833) (junior synonym)
 Truncatellina rothi (Reinhardt, 1916): synonym of Truncatellina cylindrica (J. B. Férussac, 1807) (junior subjective synonym)
 Truncatellina tauricola Lindholm, 1926: synonym of Truncatellina cylindrica (J. B. Férussac, 1807) (a junior synonym)

References 

 Bank, R. (2017). Classification of the Recent terrestrial Gastropoda of the World. Last update: July 16th, 2017.

External links
 Lowe, R. T. (1852). Brief diagnostic notices of new Maderan land shells. The Annals and Magazine of Natural History. (2) 9 (50): 112-120; (2) 9 (52): 275-279. London
 Blume, W. (1965). Die Mollusken, die Herr Prof. Franz hauptsächlich während seiner letzten Reise in Innerafrika gesammelt hat. Opuscula zoologica. 90: 1-17.

Truncatellinidae
Taxonomy articles created by Polbot